Second Cabinet of Mateusz Morawiecki is the current government of Poland headed by Prime Minister Mateusz Morawiecki since being sworn in by President Andrzej Duda on 15 November 2019. The Prime Minister delivered a statement to the Sejm on 19 November 2019 before obtaining a vote of confidence with 237 of the 460 MPs voting in the affirmative.

The government is supported by the United Right coalition consisting of Law and Justice, United Poland and the Republican Party, as well as by the Polish Affairs parliamentary group and some independent MPs. In May 2021 Kukiz'15 leader Paweł Kukiz and Law and Justice leader Jarosław Kaczyński signed a cooperation agreement between the two parties. Despite not being a part of a formal coalition and not being represented in the Council of Ministers Kukiz'15 has since supported the government especially in major votes in the Sejm.

The government underwent a reshuffle in October 2020. On 25 June 2021 the government lost its majority in the Sejm, when 3 MPs (Zbigniew Girzyński, Arkadiusz Czartoryski and Małgorzata Janowska) left Law and Justice and established a new parliamentary group (Wybór Polska, literally "Choice Poland"). The following 7 July, Czartoryski joined the Republican Party, restoring the government's majority status in the legislature.

In August 2021, a controversial bill on the amendment of the "Broadcasting and the Cinematography Act" was passed by the Sejm despite vocal opposition from Agreement, a member party of the United Right. On 11 August, Jarosław Gowin, leader of the party, was sacked from the government which in turn caused 13 other MPs to leave the governing coalition. Due to the crisis the government had once again lost its majority in the Sejm. The controversial bill was eventually vetoed by President Andrzej Duda in December 2021.

In June 2022, Agnieszka Ścigaj, the leader of Polish Affairs, was appointed a government minister. Due to the support of her parliamentary group the government has regained its formal majority status.

Cabinet

Policy

Restitution

In June 2021, Poland proposed a law to put a 10-to-30 year statute of limitation on restitution claims, which would therefore nullify cases regarding property seized during World War II, which Israel's Foreign Minister Yair Lapid described as “immoral and a disgrace.” Polish Prime Minister Mateusz Morawiecki said “I can only say that as long as I am the prime minister, Poland will not pay for German crimes: Neither zloty, nor euro, nor dollar.” Lapid also said, “We are fighting for the memory of the Holocaust victims, for the pride of our people, and we won’t allow any parliament to pass laws whose goal is to deny the Holocaust.” The proposed law would nevertheless also prevent people whose property was confiscated by the Polish communist government (1944–1989) from getting their lost property restituted/compensated.

Poland’s President Andrzej Duda finally signed the law on 14 August. In response, Israel recalled its envoy from Poland and told the Polish ambassador not to return. Nevertheless, Poland returned its envoy to Israel in July 2022 as a sign of rapprochement in bilateral relations.

Media law

In July 2021, a group of Law and Justice MPs submitted a draft of a bill on the amendment of the "Broadcasting and the Cinematography Act", which intended to prevent entities based outside the European Economic Area from owning more than 49% of shares in Polish radio and television stations. The measure was widely seen as a step against Discovery-owned television station TVN, highly critical of the ruling party, which would force the American company to divest its ownership. Law and Justice denied those accusations, claiming the bill's goal was to prevent non-EU countries, such as Russia and China, from acquiring Polish media.

In August 2021, the bill was passed in the Sejm with a vote of 228 to 216 with 10 abstentions. The amendment of the Agreement Party, a United Right ruling coalition member, which would allow companies from countries in the Organisation for Economic Co-operation and Development (OECD) to own more than 49% of shares in Polish media companies was also rejected. This resulted in sacking of Agreement's leader Jarosław Gowin from the government and a political crisis.

In September 2021, the Senate voted to reject the bill with a vote of 53 to 37 with 3 abstentions. The Sejm once again voted to pass the bill with a vote of 229 to 212 with 11 abstentions, achieving an absolute majority and overriding the Senate's veto. On December 27, amid widespread protests, President Andrzej Duda decided to veto the bill.

Social
In July 2020, Minister of Justice Zbigniew Ziobro declared he would begin preparing the formal process for Poland to withdraw from the Istanbul Convention. He claimed the treaty is harmful because it "requires that schools teach children about gender in an ideological way" and that it "de-emphasizes biological sex". On July 30, Prime Minister Morawiecki motioned for the Constitutional Tribunal to decide whether the Convention violated the Polish Constitution. As of August 2022 the case remains undecided.

In March 2021, the Ministry of Justice prepared a bill banning same-sex couples from adopting children, saying “this solution corresponds to the views of the vast majority of Polish society”. As of August 2022 the bill hasn't been put to a vote in the Sejm.

In April 2022 United Poland part of the ruling government called for tougher blasphemy laws in Poland, such as three-year jail terms for insulting church or interrupting mass. 

In October 2022, they submitted a citizens' legislative initiative for the tougher blasphemy laws with close to 400,000 signatures to parliament.

References

Polish government cabinets
History of Poland (1989–present)
Law and Justice
2019 establishments in Poland
Cabinets established in 2019
Current governments